The University Clinical Centre in Gdańsk (Polish: Uniwersyteckie Centrum Kliniczne w Gdańsku, abbreviated as UCK) is the main teaching hospital at the Medical University of Gdańsk. It is a multi-speciality hospital, the largest in the north of Poland and one of the largest in the country. It includes the Invasive Medicine Centre, completed in 2011 as one of the most modern medical facilities in Europe and the Non-Invasive Medicine Centre opened in 2018, which houses some of the hospital's in-patient departments, referred to in Polish terminology as clinics.

Organisational structure of health services
In terms of patient treatment, the University Clinical Centre consists of the following in-patient clinics:

In-patient clinics
 Clinic of Allergology and Pneumology
 Clinic of Anaesthesiology and Intensive Therapy
 Clinic of Thoracic Surgery
 Clinic of General, Endocrine and Transplant Surgery
 Clinic of Oncological Surgery
 Clinic of Plastic Surgery
 Clinic of Orthopaedics
 Clinic of Ophthalmology
 Care and Health Facility - long-term care
 Primary Care
 Clinic of Mental Illnesses and Neurotic Disorders
 Clinical Centre of Cardiology
 Clinic of Otolaryngology with Department of Oral and Maxillofacial Surgery
 Clinic of Internal Diseases, Connective Tissue Diseases and Geriatrics
 Clinic of Endocrinology and Internal Diseases
 Clinic of Dermatology, Venereology and Allergology
 Clinic of Gastroenterology and Hepatology
 Occupational Medicine
 Clinic of Haematology and Transplantology
 Clinic of Cardiac and Vascular Surgery
 Clinic of Paediatric Cardiology and Congenital Heart Defects
 Clinic of Arterial Hypertension and Diabetology
 Clinic of Paediatric and Adolescent Kidney Diseases and Hypertension
 Clinic of Nephrology, Transplantology and Internal Diseases
 Clinic of Neurosurgery
 Clinic of Adult Neurology
 Clinic of Developmental Neurology
 Clinic of Oncology and Radiotherapy
 Clinic of Paediatrics, Haematology and Oncology
 Clinic of Paediatrics, Diabetology and Endocrinology
 Clinic of Rehabilitation
 Clinical Emergency Department
 Clinic of Gynaecology, Oncological Gynaecology and Gynaecological Endocrinology
 Clinic of Obstetrics
 Clinic of Neonatology
 Clinic of Urology

References

Hospitals in Poland
Medical education in Poland
Teaching hospitals
Hospital buildings completed in 2001
Hospitals established in 2001